Shyla Heal (born 19 September 2001) is an Australian professional basketball player for the Townsville Fire of the Women's National Basketball League (WNBL).

Early life
Heal attended Brisbane State High School in Brisbane, Queensland, and Lake Ginninderra College in Canberra.

Professional career
After a season in the Queensland Basketball League (QBL) for the South West Metro Pirates in 2015, Heal debuted in the Women's National Basketball League (WNBL) in the 2015–16 season with the South East Queensland Stars as a 14-year-old. Her father, Shane Heal, was coach of the team.

Heal continued in the QBL in 2016 with the Ipswich Force and then had a short stint with the Sutherland Sharks in the Waratah League in 2017. In 2018, she split her year playing for the Sharks in the Waratah League and the BA Centre of Excellence in the SEABL.

For the 2018–19 WNBL season, Heal joined the Perth Lynx. She was injured in the first half of the season after sustaining a stress reaction in her left foot just days before round one.

After splitting 2019 with the Sutherland Sharks in the Waratah League and the Rockhampton Cyclones in the QBL, Heal joined the Bendigo Spirit for the 2019–20 WNBL season. In her debut season with the Spirit, Heal was awarded the Most Consistent Player for her showings, averaging 12.1 points and 4.1 rebounds.

In 2020, Heal played for the Townsville Fire in the WNBL Hub season. She went on to earn WNBL Youth Player of the Year and All-WNBL Second Team.

Heal was selected by the Chicago Sky in the first round of the 2021 WNBA draft. She was unable to participate in the Sky's training camp due to a delay with her visa application, and after playing just 31 minutes in four games, she was traded to the Dallas Wings who then immediately waived her.

For the 2021–22 WNBL season, Heal joined the Sydney Flames. She then played for the Northside Wizards in the 2022 NBL1 North season.

Heal returned to the Flames for the 2022–23 WNBL season, but in January 2023, she and her father, coach Shane Heal, parted ways with the Flames. The reasons for their departure were unspecified and coincided with an independent firm's investigation.

On 1 February 2023, Heal signed with the Townsville Fire for the rest of the 2022–23 WNBL season.

National team career
Heal made her international debut for the Sapphires at the 2017 FIBA Under-17 Oceania Championship in Hagåtña, Guam, where Australia would take home the gold. Heal was named MVP to the Championship game. In 2017, Heal also helped lead the Sapphires to gold at the FIBA Under-16 Asian Championship in Bengaluru, India. Heal would then go on to represent the Sapphires at the Under-17 World Cup in Belarus the following year, where they finished in third place, taking home the bronze medal. Heal also earned a spot on the All-Tournament Team, awarded to the five strongest players of the tournament, after averaging 16.0 points per game.

Heal then made her debut for the Gems at the 2019 Under-19 World Cup in Bangkok, Thailand, where the Gems took home silver after returning to the final for the first time since 1997.

Heal made her senior debut for the Opals in 2022 at the FIBA World Cup Qualifiers in Belgrade, Serbia.

Personal life
Shyla is the daughter of former Australian Boomer and NBA player, Shane Heal.

Career statistics

WNBA

Regular season

|-
| style="text-align:left;"| 2021
| style="text-align:left;"| Chicago
| 4 || 0 || 7.8 || .125 || .000 || 1.000 || .8 || .8 || .0 || .0 || 2.5 || 2.0

Source: basketball-reference.com

References

External links
Shyla Heal at Instagram

2001 births
Living people
Australian women's basketball players
Bendigo Spirit players
Chicago Sky draft picks
Chicago Sky players
Guards (basketball)
People educated at Brisbane State High School
Perth Lynx players
South East Queensland Stars players
Townsville Fire players
Sydney Uni Flames players